This is a list of schools in Espita Municipality, Yucatan. In the municipality there are 34 schools, of which 12 are preschools, 16 are primary schools, 5 are secondary schools and one is a high school.

Dzadz Pichi 
This is a list of the schools in Dzadz Pichi, Yucatan.

Preschool education 
Schools of preschool education

 Preescolar Indígena Paepi.

Primary schools 
Schools of primary education

 Primaria Comunitaria Indígena.

Espita 
This is a list of the schools in the town of Espita, Yucatan.

Preschool education 
Schools of preschool education

 Cecilio Chi.
 Rosario Castellanos.
 Tum ben há.
 Prudencio Patrón Peniche.

Primary schools 
Schools of primary education

 Estado de Michoacán.
 Rafael Ramírez Castañeda.
 Cecilio Chi.
 Prudencio Patrón Peniche.
 Nueva Creación.
 Manuela Olivares.

Secondary education 
Schools of secondary education

 Escuela Secundaria Técnica Num. 12.
 Dr. Fabián Vallado Escalante.

High school 
High schools in Espita.

Colegio de Estudios Científicos y Tecnológicos del Estado de Yucatán (Cecytey),

Holca 
This is a list of the schools in Holca, Yucatan.

Preschool education 
Schools of preschool education

 Francisco Villa.

Primary schools 
Schools of primary education

 Emiliano Zapata.

Secondary education 
Schools of secondary education

 Prudencio Patrón Peniche.

Kunche 
This is a list of the schools in Kunche, Yucatan.

Preschool education 
Schools of preschool education

 Javier Chan.

Primary schools 
Schools of primary education

 Alonso Chan.

Nacuche 
This is a list of the schools in Nacuche, Yucatan.

Preschool education 
Schools of preschool education

 Angela Peralta.

Primary schools 
Schools of primary education

 Benito Juárez García.
 Benito Juárez García.

Secondary education 
Schools of secondary education

 Mercedes Peniche López.

San Pedro Chenchela 
This is a list of the schools in San Pedro Chenchela, Yucatan.

Preschool education 
Schools of preschool education

 Preescolar comunitario.

Primary schools 
Schools of primary education

 Alfredo Peniche Erosa.

Tuzik 
This is a list of the schools in Tuzik, Yucatan.

Preschool education 
Schools of preschool education

 Preescolar comunitario.

Primary schools 
Schools of primary education

 Hermanos Serdan.

Secondary education 
Schools of secondary education

 Nicolás Bravo.

X-Ualtez 
This is a list of the schools in X-Ualtez, Yucatan.

Preschool education 
Schools of preschool education

 Preescolar comunitario.

Primary schools 
Schools of primary education

 Felipe Carrillo Puerto.

Xuilub 
This is a list of the schools in Xuilub, Yucatan.

Preschool education 
Schools of preschool education

 Preescolar comunitario.

Primary schools 
Schools of primary education

 Francisco Mendoza Palma.

References 

Espita Municipality